Mramani (or M'Ramani) is  a town located on the island of Anjouan in the Comoros.

M'
ramani est une commune urbaine d'Anjouan dans l'archipel des Comores, située dans la partie sud de l'île d'Anjouan dans la région de Niyoumakélé.

The economy

The economy of the city of Mramani is mainly related to local businesses and agricultural crops and local products such as fishing. We found the cultivation of corn from which non of the city of derivative and orange citrus. The city produces every year a famous orange juis cuvée on the occasion of the feast of ntrimba.

Populated places in Anjouan